Sihala is a genus of cellar spiders in the family Pholcidae, containing two species. The two species were once classified in the genus Pholcus, but were moved due to the absence of the characteristic sclerites shown in the bulb, and the unusually small and simple procursus.

Species
 Sihala alagarkoil Huber, 2011 — India
 Sihala ceylonicus (O. P.-Cambridge, 1869) — Sri Lanka, possibly Malaysia

References

Pholcidae
Araneomorphae genera
Spiders of Asia